(1158 – 1184) was one of the Taira clan's commanders during the Genpei War of the late Heian period of Japanese history. He was the only child of Taira no Shigemori, who was the eldest regent and heir of Taira no Kiyomori.

Early life 
Taira no Koremori was born in 1158. In contrast to his father, who was a warrior focused on battle, he grew up to be a young nobleman who enjoyed poetry and music.

Genpei War 
During the Genpei War, Koremori lost the Battle of Fujikawa in 1180. He invaded Echizen Province three years later, taking Hiuchiyama and several other of Minamoto no Yoshinaka's strongholds.  However, Yoshinaka was able to take back the strongholds and defeat Koremori during the Battle of Kurikara. 

Koremori fled the Heike headquarters during the Battle of Yashima, and sought to reunite with his family left behind in the capital. However, along the way back he met the priest Takiguchi, formerly Saito Tokiyori, on Mount Kōya and became a monk. The rumor later spread that he had boarded a boat at Hama-no-miya and set out to sea where he drowned.

Family 
His sons, Taira no Takakiyo and Taira no Chikazane, became the last members of the Taira clan after most of their relatives were killed in the Battle of Dan-no-Ura in 1185.

See also 
Tale of Heike

References

Frederic, Louis (2002). "Taira no Koremori". Japan Encyclopedia. Cambridge, Massachusetts: Harvard University Press.

Taira clan
1160 births
1184 deaths
Deified Japanese people
Kabuki characters